The Great Adventuress is a 1928 German silent comedy film directed by Robert Wiene and starring Lili Damita, Georg Alexander, and Fred Solm. Much of the film's funding came from Britain. Location shooting took place in Paris, Calais and London. The film's plot was criticised by reviews for lacking clarity.

Synopsis
The film centres on the rivalry between two competing aviation firms, one British and the other French. While in London, visiting his competitors, the head of the French firm falls in love with a young woman who turns out to be the daughter of his British rival. The film eventually ends with them marrying and the two firms merging.

Cast

References

Bibliography

External links

Films of the Weimar Republic
1928 films
German silent feature films
German comedy films
Films directed by Robert Wiene
Films set in London
Films shot in London
Films set in Paris
1928 comedy films
German aviation films
German black-and-white films
Silent comedy films
1920s German films
Fox Film films